Nothing Was All He Said or Niets Was Alles Wat Hij Zei in Dutch is a 2003 Belgian novel written by Nic Balthazar. The book is based on the real story of a man from Ghent with autism, named Tim, who committed suicide because of bullying. Balthazar would later also direct the film adaptation Ben X in 2007. Balthazar wrote the book to cause awareness to how grave the consequences of bullying can be.

Plot 
The book tells us the story of Ben. He is a seventeen-year-old boy who lives in Ghent and has Asperger syndrome and who gets bullied in school because of this. He considers suicide, but meets a girl online, nicknamed 'Barbie' whom he falls in love with. They set up a meeting and as Ben tries to commit suicide by jumping in front of an arriving train, he gets rescued by Barbie. Together, they fake his suicide and expose his bullies at his funeral. After this, Ben tries to live a normal life..

Real story 
This book is based on the true story of a Flemish boy with autism who committed suicide because of bullying. He died by jumping off the Gravensteen in Ghent.

Adaptations

The novel was adapted into a film, Ben X, two theatrical plays and a graphic novel by NDurie.

References 

2005 Belgian novels
Young adult novels
Novels about suicide
Novels set in Belgium
Books about autism
Belgian novels adapted into plays
Belgian novels adapted into films
Novels adapted into comics
Dutch-language novels